Two Banks of Four are an English jazz band from London, England, chiefly consisting of Dilip Harris/Demus, Robert Gallagher/Earl Zinger and Valerie Etienne/Jean Caramouce. They have released four LPs (with a fifth completed and awaiting release) in a 13-year association. Their music has been remixed by artists such as Four Tet, Herbert, Derrick Carter, Ingrid Eto & 4Hero while 2BO4 have themselves provided remixes for the likes of Mary Lou Williams, Astor Piazzolla and Finn Peters.

Discography

Albums
City Watching (Sirkus, 2000)
City Watching Remixes (Sirkus, 2001)
Three Street Worlds (Red Egyptian Jazz, 2003)
Junkyard Gods (Sonar Kollektiv, 2008)
Under an East Coast Moon (2013, as William Adamson)

Singles
"Street Lullaby" (12") (Sirkus, 1998)
"Skylines Over Rooftops" (12") (Sirkus, 1998)
"Speedy's Auto Repair" (7") (Sirkus, 1998)
"Afro Blue" (12") (Sirkus, 1999)
"Hook & a Line" (12") (Sirkus, 2001)
"Hook & a Line (Zed Bias Still Hooked Remix)" (12") (Sirkus, 2001)

External links
 – official site

References

English jazz ensembles